Timothy R. Billiar is an American surgeon currently the George Vance Foster Endowed Professor and Distinguished Professor of Surgery at University of Pittsburgh. His current research includes immune, cell and organ biology.

References

Year of birth missing (living people)
Living people
University of Pittsburgh faculty
American surgeons
University of Chicago alumni
Doane University alumni
Members of the National Academy of Medicine